Dark Star is a 1974 American science fiction comedy film directed and produced by John Carpenter and co-written with Dan O'Bannon. It follows the crew of the deteriorating starship Dark Star, twenty years into their mission to destroy unstable planets that might threaten future colonization of other planets.

Beginning as a University of Southern California student film produced from 1970 to 1972, it was gradually expanded to feature-length until it appeared at Filmex in 1974, and subsequently received a limited theatrical release in 1975. Its final budget is estimated at $60,000. While initially unsuccessful with audiences, it was relatively well-received by critics, and continued to be shown in theaters as late as 1980. The home video revolution of the early 1980s helped the movie achieve "cult classic" status; O'Bannon collaborated with home video distributor VCI in the production of releases on VHS, LaserDisc, DVD, and eventually Blu-ray.

Dark Star was Carpenter's feature directorial debut; he also scored the film. It was the feature debut for O'Bannon, who also served as editor, production designer, and visual effects supervisor, and appeared as Sergeant Pinback.

Plot 
In the mid-22nd century, mankind has begun to colonize interstellar space. Armed with artificially intelligent Thermostellar Triggering Devices, which can talk and reason, the scout ship Dark Star searches for "unstable planets" which might threaten future colonization.

Twenty years into its mission, the Dark Star has aged and suffers frequent malfunctions. Commanding officer Powell has died in one such event, but remains aboard in cryogenic suspension. Lieutenant Doolittle, a former surfer from Malibu, has taken over as commander. The tedium of their work has driven the crew of Pinback, Boiler, and Talby "around the bend", so they have created distractions for themselves.

Pinback plays practical jokes, maintains a video diary, and has adopted a ship's mascot in the form of a mischievous "beach ball"-like alien who refuses to stay in a storage room. After it attempts to push him down an elevator shaft, he eventually accidentally kills it with a tranquilizer gun (which pops the alien like a balloon). He claims to really be Bill Froug and says that the real Pinback has committed suicide.

En route to their next target in the Veil Nebula, the Dark Star is hit by electromagnetic energy during a space storm, resulting in another on-board malfunction. Thermostellar Bomb #20 receives an erroneous order to deploy, but the ship's computer talks it back into the bomb bay. An accident with a laser then causes more mayhem, damaging the ship's computer. Bomb #20 deploys again, and this time the crew cannot convince it to stand down. Doolittle revives Powell, who advises him to teach the bomb phenomenology. Doolittle space walks out to have a philosophical conversation with the bomb. It agrees to disarm itself for the moment.

Pinback opens the airlock to admit Doolittle, but accidentally ejects Talby, who was in the airlock attempting to repair the laser. Doolittle leaves the ship to retrieve Talby, who is in a space suit but has no maneuvering device. The bomb, having learned Cartesian doubt, trusts only itself. It is convinced that only it exists, and that its sole purpose in life is to explode, and it does so. Dark Star is destroyed, along with Pinback and Boiler. Talby and Doolittle, at a distance from the ship, are thrown clear. The former drifts into and is taken away by the Phoenix Asteroids, a travelling cluster with which he has long been fascinated. Doolittle, falling toward the unstable planet, finds an oblong hunk of debris, and surfs into the atmosphere, to die as a falling star.

Cast 
 Brian Narelle as Lieutenant Doolittle
 Dan O'Bannon as Sergeant Pinback
 Cal Kuniholm as Boiler
 Andreijah "Dre" Pahich as Talby
 John Carpenter as Talby (voice)
 Joe Saunders as Commander Powell
 John Carpenter as Commander Powell (voice)
 Barbara "Cookie" Knapp as Computer
 Dan O'Bannon as Bomb #19 (credited as "Alan Sheretz")
 Dan O'Bannon as Bomb #20 (credited as "Adam Beckenbaugh") 
 Miles Watkins as Mission Control 
 Nick Castle as Alien

Production

Screenplay 

The screenplay was written by Carpenter and O'Bannon while they were film students at the University of Southern California. Initially titled The Electric Dutchman, the original concept was Carpenter's, while O'Bannon "flesh[ed] out many of the original ideas" and contributed many of the funniest moments. According to O'Bannon, "The ending was copped from Ray Bradbury's story 'Kaleidoscope'", found in the short story collection The Illustrated Man (1951). O'Bannon references one of his USC teachers, William Froug, when Pinback says in a video diary entry, "I should tell you my name is not really Sergeant Pinback, my name is Bill Frug."

Filming, reshoots, and edits
The film began as a 45-minute 16mm student project with a final budget of six thousand dollars. Beginning with an initial budget of one thousand dollars from USC in late 1970, Carpenter and O'Bannon completed the first version of the film in early 1972. Carpenter had to dub his own voice over that of Pahich, who had a thick accent.

To achieve feature film length, an additional fifty minutes were shot in 1973, with the support of Canadian distributor Jack Murphy (credited as "Production Associate"). These scenes included the asteroid storm, Doolittle playing bottles on strings as a musical instrument, the scenes in the crew sleeping quarters, the scenes in the hallways of the ship (Pinback with the sunlamp, Boiler with the laser gun, etc.), and, importantly, all the scenes featuring the beach ball alien. Kuniholm and Pahich had shorter hair by this time, and wore wigs for continuity with the 1971 footage.

Through John Landis, a friend of O'Bannon, the movie came to the attention of producer-distributor Jack H. Harris, who obtained the theatrical distribution rights. Deeming about 30 minutes of the film "boring and unusable" (including a protracted scene of the crew sleeping in their quarters, not responding to the computer voice), he insisted that cuts be made, and additional 35mm footage be shot to bring the movie back up to a releasable length. Other edits that Harris mandated, in order to secure a more marketable G rating, toned down rough language, and blurred of a wall of nude centerfolds. O'Bannon later lamented that as a result of the alterations for commercial distribution, "We had what would have been the world’s most impressive student film and it became the world’s least impressive professional film".

Special effects 
O'Bannon created many of the special effects. Ron Cobb designed the ship, O'Bannon and Greg Jein did the model work, and Bob Greenberg did the animation. Cobb drew the original ship design on a napkin while eating at the International House of Pancakes.

To depict the transit of the Dark Star into hyperspace, O'Bannon devised an animated effect in which the stars in the background turn into streaks of light while the ship appears to be motionless. He achieved this by tracking the camera while leaving the shutter open. This is considered to be the first depiction in cinema history of a spaceship jumping into hyperspace. It is thought that O'Bannon was influenced by the striking "star gate" sequence created by Douglas Trumbull for 2001: A Space Odyssey (1968). The same effect was later employed in Star Wars (1977).

Soundtrack 

Dark Star'''s score mainly consists of electronic music created by Carpenter, using a modular synthesizer. In 1980, subsequent to the film's re-release the previous year, a soundtrack album was released, containing not only music, but also sound effects and dialogue from the film. The album was remastered for a limited 2016 vinyl rerelease, which included an additional seven-inch record containing remakes and other bonus tracks.

The song played during the opening and closing credits is "Benson Arizona". It concerns a man who travels the galaxy at the speed of light, while missing his beloved back on Earth. The music was written by Carpenter, and the lyrics by Bill Taylor. The lead vocalist was John Yager, a college friend of Carpenter. Yager was not a professional musician, "apart from being in a band in college".

 Release 
The completed film premiered on March 30, 1974, at Filmex, the Los Angeles International Film Exposition. At the time, Carpenter described the movie as "Waiting for Godot in outer space." Harris sold it to Bryanston Pictures, which opened it in fifty theatres on January 16, 1975.

In June 1979, after Carpenter and O'Bannon had found commercial success with other films, Atlantic Releasing Corporation rereleased Dark Star, noting on a promotional poster that it was "from the author of Alien & the director of Halloween", and including the tag line, "The Ultimate Cosmic Comedy!"

Home media
In August 1983, VCI Entertainment released a theatrical cut of Dark Star on videocassette. It was criticized by O'Bannon. A new video master was sourced from O'Bannon's personal 35mm print, and a widescreen "Special Edition" of the film was released by 1986.

O'Bannon later re-edited the movie into a seventy-two minute director's cut, removing much of the footage that had been shot and added after Harris had bought the distribution rights. This version was released on LaserDisc in 1992.

The film was released on DVD March 23, 1999. Both the original theatrical version and a shorter, sixty-eight minute "special edition" were included.

A two-disc "Hyperdrive Edition" DVD set was released on October 26, 2010. Along with the two versions of the movie previously released on DVD, it included a feature-length documentary, Let There be Light: The Odyssey of Dark Star, which explores the origins and production of the film.

In 2012, a "Thermostellar Edition" was released on Blu-ray. It included the special features of the 2010 release, but not the shorter special edition of the movie, only the theatrical version.

 Reception 
Audience reactions
While greeted enthusiastically by the crowd at Filmex, the film was not well-received upon its initial theatrical release. Carpenter and O'Bannon reported nearly empty theatres, and little reaction to the humor in the movie. However, the home video revolution of the early 1980s saw Dark Star become a cult film among sci-fi fans. Director Quentin Tarantino called the film a "masterpiece."

 Critical response 
An early review from Variety, recalled by Carpenter as "the first bad review I got", described the film as "a limp parody of Stanley Kubrick’s 2001: A Space Odyssey that warrants attention only for some remarkably believable special effects achieved with very little money." After its re-release in 1979, Roger Ebert gave the movie three stars out of four, writing: "Dark Star is one of the damnedest science fiction movies I've ever seen, a berserk combination of space opera, intelligent bombs, and beach balls from other worlds." Rotten Tomatoes gives it a 77% approval rating from 30 reviews, with the following consensus: "A loopy 2001 satire, Dark Star may not be the most consistent sci-fi comedy, but its portrayal of human eccentricity is a welcome addition to the genre."  Leonard Maltin awarded it two and a half stars, describing it as "enjoyable for sci-fi fans and surfers", and complimenting the effective use of the limited budget.

 Legacy 
 Influence 
The "Beachball with Claws" segment of the film was reworked by O'Bannon into the science fiction-horror film Alien (1979). After witnessing audiences failing to laugh at parts of Dark Star which were intended as humorous, O'Bannon commented, "If I can't make them laugh, then maybe I can make them scream." Doug Naylor has said in interviews that Dark Star was the inspiration for Dave Hollins: Space Cadet, the radio sketches that evolved into science fiction sitcom Red Dwarf.Dark Star has also been cited as an inspiration for the machinima series Red vs. Blue by its creator Burnie Burns. Metal Gear series creator Hideo Kojima revealed the iDroid's voice was inspired by the female computer voice from Dark Star. Benson, Arizona, has a Dark Star Road, referencing the film's song named after the city.

Indie rock band Pinback adopted its name from the character Sergeant Pinback, and often used samples from the movie in its early work. Synth-pop band Erasure sampled dialogue from this film (along with Barbarella) in their song "Sweet, Sweet Baby", the B-side to "Drama!", the debut single off their album Wild! (1989). The Human League used a sample from the film at the end of "Circus of Death", the B-side of their debut single, "Being Boiled". 

Cem Oral, under the alias Oral Experience, sampled dialogue from this film in his song "Never Been on E". The name of Pinbacker, the antagonist in Danny Boyle's film Sunshine (2007), also was inspired by Sergeant Pinback. Trevor Something used samples from Doolittle's conversation with the bomb in his 2014 mixtape Trevor Something Does Not Exist.

Progressive metal band Star One used the plot of the movie for their song "Spaced Out," with the name take from the film tagline "The Spaced Out Odyssey". German Digital Hardcore artist Bomb 20 is named after Bomb #20 from this film. Gravity Wine Co., based in Victoria, Australia, produces a red wine blend of Syrah and Grenache that is called Dark Star and which has "Dark Star - Phoenix Asteroids" written as a title at the top of the information section on its label.

See also
 List of American films of 1974

References

 Further reading 
 Holdstock, Robert. Encyclopedia of Science Fiction, Octopus Books, 1978, pp. 80–81. 
 Cinefex magazine, issue 2, Aug 1980. Article by Brad Munson: "Greg Jein, Miniature Giant". (Discusses Dark Star, among other subjects.)
 Fantastic Films magazine, Oct 1978, vol. 1 no. 4, pages 52–58, 68–69. James Delson interviews Greg Jein, about Dark Star and other projects Jein had worked on.
 Fantastic Films magazine, Sep 1979, issue 10,  pages 7–17, 29–30. Dan O'Bannon discusses Dark Star and Alien, other subjects. (Article was later reprinted in "The very best of Fantastic Films", Special Edition #22 as well.)
 Fantastic Films magazine, Collector's Edition #17, Jul 1980, pages 16–24, 73, 76–77, 92. (Article: "John Carpenter Overexposed" by Blake Mitchell and James Ferguson. Discusses Dark Star, among other things.)
 Bradbury, Ray, Kaleidoscope  Doubleday & Company 1951
 Foster, Alan Dean. Dark Star, Futura Publications, 1979. . (Adapted from the script by Dan O'Bannon and John Carpenter)

 External links 
 
 
 
 
 
 Dark Star at The Official John Carpenter''
 

1974 films
1970s parody films
1970s science fiction comedy films
American independent films
American science fiction comedy films
American space adventure films
American parody films
American student films
1970s English-language films
Films about extraterrestrial life
Films directed by John Carpenter
Films scored by John Carpenter
Films set in the 22nd century
Films set on spacecraft
Films with screenplays by Dan O'Bannon
Films with screenplays by John Carpenter
Films produced by John Carpenter
1974 directorial debut films
1974 comedy films
1974 independent films
1970s American films